The 2007–08 Elitserien season was the 33rd season of Elitserien. It began on September 24, 2007, with the regular season ending March 8, 2008. The playoffs of the 84th Swedish Championship ended on April 18, with HV71 taking the championship.

League business

Rule changes
Elitserien brought in a rule change to the rules regarding icing. The team that plays the puck to icing is not allowed to change players before the next faceoff.

Regular season

Final standings
GP = Games Played, W = Wins, L = Losses, T = Ties, OTW = Overtime Wins, OTL = Overtime Losses, GF = Goals For, GA = Goals Against, Pts = Points
x - clinched playoff spot, y - clinched regular season league title, e - eliminated from playoff contention, r - play in relegation series

Playoffs
After the regular season, the standard of 8 teams qualified for the playoffs.

Playoff bracket
In the first round, the highest remaining seed chose which of the four lowest remaining seeds to be matched against. In the second round, the highest remaining seed was matched against the lowest remaining seed. In each round the higher-seeded team was awarded home ice advantage. Each best-of-seven series followed a 1–1–1–2–1–1 format: the higher-seeded team played at home for games 2 and 4 (plus 5 and 7 if necessary), and the lower-seeded team was at home for game 1, 3 and 6 (if necessary).

Elitserien awards

External links

1
Swedish Hockey League seasons
Swe